The COVID-19 vaccination in Spain is the national vaccination strategy started on the 27th of December 2020 in order to vaccinate the country's population against COVID-19 within the international effort to fight the COVID-19 pandemic.

As of November 23, 2021, the following doses had been received: 59,296,575 Pfizer–BioNTech COVID-19 vaccine doses, 16,105,300 Moderna vaccine doses, 17,427,500 Oxford–AstraZeneca vaccine doses and 2,659,000 Janssen vaccine doses, totaling to 95,488,375 doses. Out of these doses, 75,173,640 had been administered.

The autonomous communities with the highest fully-vaccinated percentage are Asturias (85.1%) and Galicia (84.9%), while the communities with the lowest percentage are the Canary Islands (75.7%) and the Balearic Islands (72.4%). The Spanish average percentage was 79.1%, amounting to 37,557,243 people.

Out of the total, 3,776,118 have been administered as additional doses, or third doses, of which 3,319,229 are Pfizer–BioNTech COVID-19 vaccine doses and 456,889 are Moderna vaccine doses.

The amount of doses ordered from Q1 to Q4 of 2021 is 141,943,261.

Vaccines on order 
There are several COVID-19 vaccines at various stages of development around the world.

Phases and development of the vaccination campaign 
According to the Government of Spain, the vaccination campaign, which is being carried out voluntarily, is structured in four phases. These phases are at the same time formed by different population groups defined in the National COVID-19 Vaccination Strategy :

Notes: The information shown in the table is collected up to September 1, 2021.

Public opinion

Centre for Sociological Research 
According to the Centre for Sociological Research, the Spanish public organism in charge of investigating the public opinion of the society on many different topics, these are the data of the acceptance of the vaccine among the Spanish population:

From February 2021 onwards, the centre began to ask among those who did not want to take the vaccine about the reasons they had for choosing not to receive the shot, obtaining the following results:

Vaccinated Spanish public figures 
The progress of the vaccination campaign to more and more demographic groups has allowed many public figures to receive one or two doses of the vaccine correspondent to them by age or belonging to some other priority group.

Politicians

State authorities 

 King Philip VI of Spain received the vaccine on May 29, 2021, at 53 years old. The head of State received the vaccine without medical transcendence, and was only informed after receiving the jab. He was vaccinated once the access for his age group was opened, at the massive vaccination point set up in WiZink Center in Madrid, as any other citizen. He was accompanied by the head of the Royal Family medical service, Juan Martínez, and by the Vice-councillor for Public Health and COVID-19 Plan of the Community of Madrid, Antonio Zapatero. Regarding the vaccine brand, although it was not officially communicated, it is known that only Janssen vaccines were given that day. With respect to the published images, these were not distributed by the Royal Family, however, the TV programme Cuatro al día from the Spanish broadcasting station Cuatro published a picture of the head of State receiving the vaccine.

Statistics

Progress to date

References

External links 

 

2021 in Spain
Health care in Spain
Vaccination campaign
Spain